Riga Cathedral Choir School is a state-run school in Riga, Latvia for boys and girls aged 7 to 18. It provides both musical and general education, and has a well-known boys' choir as well as a girls' choir.
The school was created on July 12, 1994.
Riga Cathedral Choir School provides the following state funded licensed programs:
 Basic Education program unified curriculum including vocational education programs Vocal music, Choir class.
 Vocational education program Choral Conducting – choir singer, choir master specialities;
 Vocational education program Vocal music – academic singing – choir singer specialty;
 Vocational education program Music – jazz musician specialty.

External links 
 School website

Educational institutions established in 1994
Schools in Latvia
Choir schools
Education in Riga
1994 establishments in Latvia